Grlava (in older sources Grlova) is a small village in the Municipality of Ljutomer in northeastern Slovenia. The area belongs to the traditional Styria region and is now included in the Mura Statistical Region.

There is a small Neo-Gothic chapel in the settlement. It was built in 1912 and renovated in 1994.

References

External links
Grlava on Geopedia

Populated places in the Municipality of Ljutomer